Denise Provost (born March 9, 1951 in Lewiston, Maine) is an American politician who represented the 27th Middlesex District in the Massachusetts House of Representatives from 2006 until 2020 and was a member of the Somerville, Massachusetts Board of Aldermen from 2000–2006.

In the Massachusetts gubernatorial election, 2014, Provost endorsed Don Berwick for Governor of Massachusetts.

See also
 2019–2020 Massachusetts legislature

References

External links

1951 births
Democratic Party members of the Massachusetts House of Representatives
Politicians from Somerville, Massachusetts
Bennington College alumni
Boston University School of Law alumni
Living people
Women state legislators in Massachusetts
21st-century American politicians
21st-century American women politicians